The 32nd Curtis Cup Match was played on August 3 and 4, 2002 at Fox Chapel Golf Club near Pittsburgh, Pennsylvania. The United States won 11 to 7. Carol Semple Thompson made her 12th and final appearance, having first played in 1974.

Format
The contest was a two-day competition, with three foursomes and six singles matches on each day, a total of 18 points.

Each of the 18 matches was worth one point in the larger team competition. If a match was all square after the 18th hole extra holes were not played. Rather, each side earned  a point toward their team total. The team that accumulated at least 9 points won the competition. In the event of a tie, the current holder retained the Cup.

Teams
Eight players for the USA and Great Britain & Ireland participated in the event plus one non-playing captain for each team.

Saturday's matches

Morning foursomes

Afternoon singles

Sunday's matches

Morning foursomes

Afternoon singles

References

External links
Official site
USGA archive

Curtis Cup
Golf in Pennsylvania
Curtis Cup
Curtis Cup
Curtis Cup
Curtis Cup